Marsupilami is a video game developed by British studio Apache Software and published by Sega for the Genesis in 1995–1996.

Reception

The game received average reviews. Next Generation said, "all in all, Marsupilami is a traditional side-scrolling platform game with the gameplay aimed toward a younger audience. If you're searching for the same old gameplay, Marsupilami is for you." Spanish magazine HobbyConsolas, however, gave it 82%. GamePro summed up the review by saying, "Marsupilami is packaged as a kid's game, but the stiff controls and quick timer make the puzzle solving tough and may drive younger gamers to tears. The perky, comical animations are pleasant enough, but the plucky, happy circus music grates. In short, keep this cart confined at your nearest retailer."

Notes

References

External links
 

1995 video games
Marsupilami
Platform games
Sega games
Sega Genesis games
Sega Genesis-only games
Sega video games
Single-player video games
Video games based on comics
Video games developed in the United Kingdom